Citreoviridin is a mycotoxin which is produced by Penicillium and Aspergillus species. If rice, corn, cereals or meat products are contaminated with Penicillin citreoviridin, citreoviridin can be produced if the food is stored in a damp place. Consuming food which is contaminated with citreoviridin can cause the disease cardiac beri beri. Furthermore it damages liver and kidneys.

References

Further reading 

 

Citreoviridin